Paul Morgan (born 1964) is the former superior of the British district of the Society of St Pius X, a traditionalist Catholic organisation in irregular canonical standing with the Holy See.

Biography
Morgan was ordained by Archbishop Marcel Lefebvre at Écône in 1988.  He has served in the United States and the Philippines, served as Principal of St. Michael's, the Society's school, and was Superior of the SSPX in Great Britain between 2003 and 2015.  He is the son of William J. Morgan, a lay theologian who was an advocate of the sedevacantist theory.  He is strongly opposed to the Second Vatican Council which he claims contain "modernist errors".

Morgan vociferously opposed the decision of the small traditionalist community known as the Transalpine Redemptorists (who had previously been associated with the Society of St. Pius X) to reconcile with the Vatican. Morgan is also opposed to any reconciliation by the SSPX with Rome, until they repudiate what he sees as their errors.

See also

References

External links
 Website of the SSPX in Great Britain

1964 births
Living people
Catholicism-related controversies
English traditionalist Catholics
Members of the Society of Saint Pius X
Traditionalist Catholic priests